The 2012 season of the astronomy TV show Star Gazers starring Dean Regas, James Albury, and Marlene Hidalgo, started on January 2, 2012. The show's episode numbering scheme changed several times during its run to coincide with major events in the show's history. The official Star Gazers website hosts the complete scripts for each of the shows.  After February 2012, the old jackstargazer.com website discontinued the practice of archiving its own copies of scripts from the show; and starting in July 2012, links to scripts from the jackstargazer.com website were directed to the "Episodes" page of the newer stargazersonline.org website. 


2012 season

References

External links 
  Star Gazer official website
  Star Gazers official website
 

Lists of Jack Horkheimer: Star Gazer episodes
2012 American television seasons